Cove Orchard is an unincorporated community in Yamhill County, in the U.S. state of Oregon. It is along Oregon Route 47 between Yamhill and Gaston in the northern part of the county.

According to Oregon Geographic Names, F. C. Graham of Portland platted the community and chose the name. Cove Orchard had a post office from 1912 to 1953.

References

Unincorporated communities in Yamhill County, Oregon
Unincorporated communities in Oregon